Booker Little is an album by American jazz trumpeter Booker Little featuring performances recorded in 1960 for the Time label.

Reception
The Allmusic review by Scott Yanow awarded the album 4½ stars and stated "Trumpeter Booker Little's second session as a leader (there would only be four) is a quartet outing that puts the emphasis on relaxed tempoes. Little's immediately recognizable melancholy sound and lyrical style are heard in top form".

Track listing
All compositions, and all sessions led, by Booker Little except as indicated
 "Opening Statement" - 6:42 
 "Minor Sweet" - 5:38 
 "Bee Tee's Minor Plea" - 5:40 
 "Life's a Little Blue" - 6:53 
 "The Grand Valse" - 4:57 
 "Who Can I Turn To?" (Alec Wilder, William Engvick) - 5:25

The following tracks appear in some CD reissues, and do not include the same personnel as the original session and LP. Most CD reissues keep the original LP format. 

7. "My Old Flame" [take 1 stereo] (Sam Coslow, Arthur Johnston) - 3:34  (Max Roach Quartet) Bonus track on CD reissue
8. "My Old Flame" [take 2 mono] (Coslow, Johnston) - 3:38 (Max Roach Quartet) Bonus track on CD reissue
9. "Sweet and Lovely" (Gus Arnheim, Jules LeMare, Harry Tobias) - 4:14Bonus track on CD reissue
10. "Moonlight Becomes You" (Johnny Burke, Jimmy Van Heusen) - 5:41 Bonus track on CD reissue
11. "Blues De Tambour" (Ed Shaughnessy) - 3:39 (Teddy Charles Sextet) Bonus track on CD reissue
12. "Tune Up" (Miles Davis) - 5:21 (Max Roach New Quintet) Bonus track on CD reissue
*Recorded in Chicago in June 1958 (tracks 7 & 8), at the Newport Jazz Festival, Rhode Island on July 6, 1958 (track 12), and in New York City in October 1958 (tracks 9 & 10), April 13, 1960 (tracks 1, 2, 5 & 6) April 15, 1960 (tracks 3 & 4), and August 25, 1960 (track 11).

Personnel
Booker Little - trumpet
Tommy Flanagan (tracks 1, 2, 5, 6), Wynton Kelly (tracks 3 & 4)  - piano
Scott LaFaro (tracks 1-6) - bass
Roy Haynes (tracks 1-6) - drums

additional tracks on later CD reissues : 

George Coleman (tracks 7-10 & 12) - tenor sax 
Ray Draper (tracks 9, 10 & 12) - tuba 
Eddie Baker (tracks 7 & 8), Tommy Flanagan (tracks 9 & 10), Mal Waldron (track 11)  - piano
Bob Cranshaw (tracks 7 & 8), Art Davis (tracks 9, 10 & 12), Addison Farmer (track 11) - bass
Max Roach (tracks 7-10 & 12), Ed Shaughnessy (track 11) - drums

References

Booker Little albums
1960 albums